Eaton School District RE-2 is a school district headquartered in Eaton, Colorado.

Schools
 Eaton High School
 Eaton Middle School
 Benjamin Eaton Elementary School
 Eaton Elementary School
 Galeton Elementary School

References

External links
 Eaton School District

School districts in Colorado
Education in Weld County, Colorado